The Kibara Mountains (French: Monts Kibara) are a range in the Katanga Province of the Democratic Republic of the Congo.  
They are partly within the Upemba National Park.

The Kibara mountains were once part of a continuous plateau in northern Katanga that also included the Mitumba and Kundelungu blocks, and has now been divided by deep valleys.
The Upemba depression lies to the west of the Kibara mountains.
The Lufira River separates them from the Mitumba Mountains to the east.
Above  the soil is generally poor, sandy and partly lateritized, and becomes very dry in the dry season.
Vegetation is low grassland or steppe.  There are few trees or bushes.

The mountains have a NE-SW trend, and are folded and intruded.
They have been strongly uplifted. 
The mountains give their name to the Kibaran orogeny.  In 1931 Robert studied the mountains and introduced the terms "Complexe des Kibara" and "Système des Kibara" to describe his theory of their origins, a mountain-building process that followed a geosyncline episode.

References

Sources

Mountain ranges of the Democratic Republic of the Congo
Haut-Katanga Province
Haut-Lomami